María Lionza is one of the main deities in Venezuelan spiritism.
    
María Lionza may also refer to:
 María Lionza (statue), monument in Caracas
 María Lionza, a 2006 Venezuelan telefilm starring Ruddy Rodríguez
 "María Lionza", a 1978 song by Rubén Blades and Willie Colón from Siembra
 "Maria Lionza", a 2009 composition by Devendra Banhart from What Will We Be